Charles Henry Cooper (September 29, 1926 – February 5, 1984) was an American professional basketball player. He and two others, Nat "Sweetwater" Clifton and Earl Lloyd, became the first African-American players in the National Basketball Association (NBA) in 1950. Cooper was also the first African-American to be drafted by an NBA team, as the first pick of the second round by the Boston Celtics. Cooper was inducted into the Naismith Memorial Basketball Hall of Fame on September 9, 2019.

Early life and college career 
Cooper was born in Pittsburgh, Pennsylvania, the son of Daniel and Emma Cooper. Daniel was a mailman, and Emma was a school teacher. He attended Pittsburgh's Westinghouse High School and graduated in 1944. For his senior year, he averaged more than 13 points per game and was an All-City first-team center. He then attended and played a semester of basketball for West Virginia State College (now University) before being drafted to serve in the United States Navy in the final stages of World War II.

Following his service, he enrolled at Duquesne University where he was an All-American, started all four years, and set the school record for total points with 990 in four seasons. During his time at Duquesne, the team had a 78–19 record and was invited to the then-prestigious National Invitation Tournament twice. He was a captain for the 1949–50 team, which was the first team from the university to be nationally ranked all season, finishing with a 23–6 record and ranked sixth nationally.  He was the first African American to participate in a college basketball game south of the Mason–Dixon line.

NBA career 
 Coming out of college in 1950, he signed onto the Harlem Globetrotters. On April 25, 1950, he became the first African American drafted into the NBA when the Boston Celtics chose him with the 14th overall pick. Cooper was drafted by Celtics' owner Walter A. Brown, coached by the legendary Red Auerbach and a teammate of the great Bob Cousy. When officials from other teams learned of Boston's interest in Cooper, they suggested he should not be drafted because he was black; however, Brown's famous quote was: "I don't give a damn if he's striped, plaid or polka dot. Boston takes Charles Cooper of Duquesne." Cooper made his NBA debut on November 1, 1950, against the Fort Wayne Pistons.

Cooper played four years with the Celtics, then was traded to the Milwaukee Hawks before ending his career as a member of the Ft. Wayne Pistons. After that, he spent a year playing for the Harlem Magicians, before injuring his back in a car crash and leaving basketball. During his NBA career, Cooper played a total of 409 games, scored 2,725 points for an average of 6.66 points per game, had 2,431 rebounds for an average of 5.9 per game, and had 733 assists for an average of 1.79 per game. As some statistics were not kept during that time, it is not known how many blocked shots, steals, or turnovers he had during his career.

After the NBA 
After his NBA career, Cooper graduated with a Master of Social Work from the University of Minnesota in 1960. He was married twice; first in 1951, and then in 1957 to Irva Lee (with whom he had four children). He worked to improve his hometown of Pittsburgh, serving on the Pittsburgh school board, and was appointed the director of parks and recreation for the city, becoming the first Black department head. He also helped the Pittsburgh National Bank's affirmative action program as an urban affairs officer until he died in Pittsburgh at the age of 57 on February 5, 1984, of liver cancer at Forbes Hospice.

NBA career statistics

Regular season

Playoffs

See also 
Basketball in the United States
Race and ethnicity in the NBA

References

External links 
 Chuck Cooper's career NBA Stats from databasketball.com
 Biography at answers.com
 
 Phil Axelrod, "Duquesne honors legacy of Chuck Cooper", Pittsburgh Post-Gazette, December 6, 2009.

1926 births
1984 deaths
African-American basketball players
All-American college men's basketball players
American men's basketball players
Basketball players from Pittsburgh
Boston Celtics draft picks
Boston Celtics players
Burials at Homewood Cemetery
Duquesne Dukes men's basketball players
Fort Wayne Pistons players
Harlem Globetrotters players
Milwaukee Hawks players
Naismith Memorial Basketball Hall of Fame inductees
Shooting guards
Small forwards
St. Louis Hawks players
West Virginia State Yellow Jackets men's basketball players
United States Navy personnel of World War II
20th-century African-American sportspeople
University of Minnesota alumni
Deaths from liver cancer
Deaths from cancer in Pennsylvania